There have been strong reactions to the International Court of Justice advisory opinion on Kosovo's declaration of independence, rendered on 22 July 2010. The ruling, which held that the Kosovo declaration of independence was not in violation of international law, drew praise from some quarters and negative reactions from other quarters led by Serbia and other states which said their position would not change.

Involved parties

Former republics of Yugoslavia

International organisations

Countries that recognise Kosovo

Countries that do not recognise Kosovo

States with limited or no recognition

State and non-state nationalist movements

See also
 International recognition of Kosovo

References 

2010 in international relations
Independence of Kosovo
Reactions to 2000s events